Doris Inge Wegener (18 August 1943 – 13 February 2001), better known by her stage name Manuela , was a German singer.

Life 

Manuela was born and died in Berlin.  She worked in Germany as a singer of Schlager songs. She played in some German films like Im singenden Rößl am Königssee (1963),  Twenty Girls and the Teachers (1971) and  Schuld war nur der Bossa Nova (1992).

Discography

Singles 
1962 Hula-Serenade
1963 Schuld war nur der Bossa Nova (cover-version of: Blame It on the Bossa nova from Eydie Gormé)
1963 Ich geh noch zur Schule  (cover-version of: On Top of Old Smokey)
1963 Mama, ich sag' dir was
1963 Hey, Manuela EP
1964 Mama (EP Spain)
1964 Schwimmen lernt man im See (cover-version from: Just So Bobby Can See by Diane Ray)
1964 Horch, was kommt von draußen rein (English version There Goes Charly)
1964 Schneemann
1964 Manuela (Spanien)
1964 Schwimmen lernt man im See (EP)
1965 Küsse unterm Regenbogen
1965 Love and Kisses
1965 The Nitty Gritty
1965 Things Are So Different (Brazil)
1966 Es ist zum Weinen
1966 Dumme sterben niemals aus
1966 Spotlight on Manuela (Netherlands)
1966 Die goldene Zeit (together with Drafi Deutscher)
1967 Lord Leicester aus Manchester
1967 Monsieur Dupont
1967 Wenn es Nacht wird in Harlem  (cover-version from: When a Man Loves a Woman by Percy Sledge)
1968 Guantanamera
1968 Stille Nacht Heilige Nacht
1968 Que-Sara
1968 Señor Gonzales
1968 Bobby
1969 Wenn du liebst/Jingle Jangle (same cover-version)
1969 Helicopter U.S. Navy 66
1966 Manuela macht Mode mit Musik
1970 Alles und noch viel mehr (Cover-version of: All Kinds of Everything from Dana)
1970 ABC
1970 Verliebt in Amsterdam
1970 Daddy  (Cover-version of: Grandad from Clive Dunn)
1970 It Takes a Lot of Tenderness
1971 Monky Monkey (USA)
1971 I Hear Those Church Bells Ringing
1971 Der schwarze Mann auf dem Dach (Cover-version of: Jack in the Box from Clodagh Rodgers)
1971 Prost, Onkel Albert
1972 Es lebe das Geburtstagskind
1972 Ich hab' mich verliebt in dich
1972 Gitarren-Boy
1973 Etwas in mir wurde traurig (Cover-version of: Killing Me Softly with His Song by Lori Lieberman or Roberta Flack)
1973 Da sagen sich die Füchse gute Nacht
1973 Komm wieder
1973 Was hast du gemacht
1973 Ich war noch nie so glücklich
1973 Hey Look at Me Now
1973 You Are My Music (USA)
1974 Gestohlene Orangen
1974 Ich möcht gern dein Herz Klopfen hör'n 
1974 Twingel Dingel Dee
1974 Boing,Boing die Liebe
1975 Was hast du gemacht
1975 Fudschijama-Hama-Kimono
1975 Ein schöner Tag mit viel Musik
1980 Doch mein Herz bleibt immer in Athen
1980 I Believe in the USA
1980 You Are My Sunshine
1980 Was soll ein Bayer in der Hitparade (together with Sepp Haslinger)
1980 Friede auf Erden
1981 It's Hard to Explain
1984 Und der Wind
1984 Ich bin wieder da
1985 Rhodos bei Nacht
1986 Auf den Stufen zur Akropolis
1987 Ewiges Feuer
1988 Oh, Mandolino
1990 Heimatland
1990 Für immer (Cover-version of: You Got It by Roy Orbison)
1990 When a Man Loves a Woman
1991 Friede auf Erden
1991 Freiheit ohne Glück (Manuela and Cantus)

Albums 
1963 Manuela!
1965 Die großen Erfolge
1966 Manuela & Drafi
1968 Rund um die Welt
1968 Manuela – Manuela – Manuela (USA)
1968 Star-Boutique Manuela. Die großen Erfolge 21968 Die großen Erfolge 31969 Weihnachten wie wir es lieben (together with the Schöneberger Sängerknaben)
1970 Die großen Erfolge. Made in Germany & USA1970 Lieder aus dem Märchenland (together with Schöneberger Sängerknaben)
1971 Songs of Love – Manuela in USA1972 Wenn du in meinen Träumen bei mir bist1972 Portrait in Musik1973 Manuela in Las Vegas1973 Die Liebe hat tausend Namen1973 Ich war noch nie so glücklich1980 I Want to Be a Cowboy's Sweethart1980 Manuela – The golden Hits1980 Manuela singt Manuela1980 Manuela ein musikalisches Porträt1980 Manuela 801984 Ich bin wieder da1988 Goldene Hits – Das Jubiläumsalbum1988 Ein schöner Tag mit viel Musik1988 Olé Mallorca und 14 goldene Hits
1989 Manuela – Ihre größten Erfolge1991 Sehnsucht nach der Heimat1992 Jive Manuela – Die Original Schlager-Tanz-Party1993 Wenn ich erst wieder Boden spür' 1993 St. Vincent1994 Die größten Erfolge – Neuaufnahmen1995 ...für den Frieden – gegen den Krieg1997 Schuld war nur der Bossa Nova (Sonia)
1999 Manuela – Das Beste – Die Original Hits 1963–19722000 Manuela – Das Beste – Die Original Hits 1962–1978 – Folge 22001 Hey Look at Me Now2001 Dich vergessen kann ich nie2001 Golden Stars – The Best of Manuela2001 Schuld war nur der Bossa Nova (3 CDs mit Manuelas größten Erfolgen)
2003 Alles und noch viel mehr...2003 Schuld war nur der Bossa Nova2003 Portrait Manuela (gold-serie)
2004 Das Beste von Manuela2005 Manuela. Die Liebe hat tausend Namen2007 Manuela Erinnerungen (ihres Komponisten)Chris Brown (Christian Bruhn)2008 Wenn Augen sprechen2010 Manuela Special Edition2011 Weißt du´s noch2011 Schuld war nur der Bossa Nova (Doppel-CD)2011 Schuld war nur der Bossa Nova Awards 
 Bronze-Lion (1964), special award „Goldene Bonny" (1964) and Silver Lion (1968) by Radio Luxemburg
 Coupe d'or, Italy (1965, 1966 and 1967)
 Bravo Otto four times in gold (1966, 1969, 1970 and 1971) and also four times in silver (1965, 1967, 1968 and 1972)
 Goldene Schallplatte (1968)
 Goldene Stimmgabel (1991 and 1992)

 Literature 
 Kraushaar, E.: Mutmaßungen über Manuela, in: Kraushaar, E.: Rote Lippen. Die ganze Welt des deutschen Schlagers. Hamburg 1983, pages 137–150.
 Herrwerth, T.: Partys, Pop und Petting. Die Sixties im Spiegel der BRAVO. Marburg 1997
 Hoersch, T.: BRAVO 1956–2006. Munich 2006.
 Rentzsch, P.: Einmal zu den Sternen und zurück. Das Buch der Wahrheit.'' Freier Falke Verlag 2008, pages 203–211, 283 f.

References

External links 

 
 fanclub Manuela (german)
 SWR:Bews over Manuela by broadcaster SWR4

Schlager musicians
Musicians from Berlin
1943 births
2001 deaths
20th-century German women singers
Folk-pop singers